Kafr Qandil  is a village of Markaz Atfih in the Giza governorate of Egypt. According to statistics for the year 2020, the total population was 12,841 people, 6,927 men and 5,869 women.

See also 

 Timeline of the 2011 Egyptian revolution since the resignation of Mubarak.

References 

Villages in Egypt